Bim is a 1975 film from Trinidad and Tobago.

Bim or BIM also may refer to:

Places
 A nickname for the island of Barbados
 Bim, West Virginia, an unincorporated community in Boone County, West Virginia
 IATA code BIM for South Bimini Airport

People and groups
 Bim (name)
 James May (born 1963), a British television presenter nicknamed Bim.
 Bim (band), an early 1980s new wave band in which Cameron McVey and Stephen Street were members
 Bim (pop duo), London-based pop duo from Somerset
 Bim Bom, a Soviet circus clown duo consisting of Ivan Radunsky as Bim and various artists as Bom
 Roy Forbes (born 1953), Canadian musician who used to go by the stage name Bim
 Bim, a fictional character played by Frank Faylen in the 1945 film The Lost Weekend

Organizations
 Banca Intermobiliare, an Italian bank
 Bim (company), a Turkish retail store chain
 Bharathidasan Institute of Management, a business school affiliated to Bharathidasan University
 Bord Iascaigh Mhara, the Irish Sea Fisheries Board
 British Institute of Management, London

Science and technology 

 BCL2L11, protein from Bcl-2 protein family produced by bim gene
 BiM, abbreviation for bimetal
 BiM, Binary MPEG format for XML
 Binary Independence Model, a probabilistic information retrieval technique
 Blade Inspection Method for helicopters
 Building Information Modeling, within construction, a process involving the generation and management of digital representations of physical and functional characteristics of buildings
Building Information Model, the resulting file from Building Information Modeling
CM-BIM, Certificate of Management - Building Information Modeling, a certification from the Associated General Contractors of America (AGC)

Other uses
 Bahasa Isyarat Malaysia, or Malaysian Sign Language
 Bim, a colloquial name for trams in Vienna
 Bim (1950 film), a short film directed by Albert Lamorisse
 BIM (magazine), a Caribbean literary magazine founded in 1942 by Frank Collymore

See also
 Brighton Institute of Modern Music, abbreviated BIMM
 "Hey Bim!", an episode of the travel documentary James May: Our Man in Japan